Oblivious is a hidden camera comedy game show that aired on ITV from 14 July to 24 December 2001 and hosted by Davina McCall. It came back as a one-off special on 4 March 2003 entitled Oblivious Popstars.

References

External links
 

2001 British television series debuts
2003 British television series endings
2000s British comedy television series
2000s British game shows
English-language television shows
Hidden camera television series
ITV comedy
ITV game shows
Television series by Banijay